Hemiolaus cobaltina is a butterfly in the family Lycaenidae. It is found in Madagascar.

References

External links
Die Gross-Schmetterlinge der Erde 13: Die Afrikanischen Tagfalter. Plate XIII 67 c also (typo) baltina

Butterflies described in 1899
Hypolycaenini
Butterflies of Africa
Taxa named by Per Olof Christopher Aurivillius